Shanker Ramakrishnan is an Indian film screenwriter, director, producer and actor, who works primarily in the Malayalam cinema.

Career
He started his career immediately after completing post-graduation from the School of Management Studies, CUSAT.

In the collective film Kerala Café, Shankar scripted and directed the critically acclaimed film segment "Island Express". Prithviraj who played the lead character “Leon” in the film invited Shankar to write August Cinema's maiden venture “Urumi”. Urumi was a historical drama film directed and filmed by Santosh Sivan with Prithviraj and Genelia in the lead roles. The movie created a turning point in Shankar's artistic career and gave him opportunities to work on the wider canvas.

V. K. Prakash, the National Award winner, invited Shankar to write the Malayalam version of the Hindi film "Freaky Chakra". The Malayalam version was titled "Netholi oru Cheriya Meen Alla" and was a postmodern experimental film starring Fahadh Faasil and Kamalinee Mukherjee.

Shankar's filmography took a surprise detour when his mentor Ranjith offered him a role to play Alexey Thadeus, the free-spirited cancer patient, in his movie “Spirit”. The role won Shankar the ‘SIIMA Award for Best Male Debutant and best supporting actor awards including the ‘Mathrubhumi Medimix Movie Award’. Spirit was followed by V.K.P's “Poppins” and G.S. Vijayan's “Bavuttiyude Namathil” starring Mammootty and  written by Ranjith.

Shankar then went on to play vivid characters in movies like "Seconds", Sreebala K. Menon's “Love 24X7” with Dileep, and Bobby-Sanjay's "How Old Are You" with Manju Warrier, directed by Roshan Andrews.

He took a break from acting and began working on the mega project "Kunjali Marikkar IV"" originally written by T. P. Rajeevan. The movie was initially expected to hit screens by end of 2018; however the film was indefinitely postponed owing to prior commitments of the crew. Shankar has also completed the scripting of "My Story", which will have Prithviraj and Parvathy playing the lead roles.

Shankar recently announced his directorial debut with Pathinettam Padi" to be produced by August Cinema. The video casting call for the new movie was hosted by actor Nivin Pauly on 17 August 2017, which went viral in the social media. On 2 October 2017, actor Mohanlal unveiled the title art of the movie.

Filmography 

All films are in Malayalam language unless otherwise noted.

As actor

As Scriptwriter

As director 

Television

References

External links 
 

Year of birth missing (living people)
Living people
Place of birth missing (living people)
Malayalam film directors
Malayalam screenwriters
Male actors in Malayalam cinema
Indian male film actors
Film directors from Thiruvananthapuram
21st-century Indian male actors
21st-century dramatists and playwrights
Screenwriters from Thiruvananthapuram
Male actors from Thiruvananthapuram
21st-century Indian screenwriters
Government Law College, Thiruvananthapuram alumni